Eduard Canimas (born 6 June 1965) is a Catalan musician and singer. He had played with Adrià Puntí and with a band called Zitzània in the nineties. In 2003 he published his first solo album.

Discography 
With Zitzània:
 "Orquídies i ortopèdies" (1994). (Mixtape)
 "La peixera dels tòtils" (1997). Música Global

Solo:
 Canimas i rebentes (2003). A.R.T.P. Discogràfica 
 Noh iha crisi (2006). Música Global 
 Sagrat cor (2010). Música Global

References 

1965 births
Living people
People from Gironès
Singers from Catalonia
Singer-songwriters from Catalonia
Catalan-language singers
Música Global artists